Betty Barbara Schenke married name Betty Greenslade is a former Australian international lawn bowler.

Bowls career
Betty was part of the fours team that won a silver medal at the 1986 Commonwealth Games in Edinburgh.

She joined the Walkerville Bowling Club in 1972 and represented South Australia from 1976 to 1994.

She won two medals at the 1989 Asia Pacific Bowls Championships in the pairs and fours, in Suva, Fiji.

References 

Australian female bowls players
Living people
Year of birth missing (living people)
Commonwealth Games silver medallists for Australia
Commonwealth Games medallists in lawn bowls
Bowls players at the 1986 Commonwealth Games
20th-century Australian women
Medallists at the 1986 Commonwealth Games